The Immortalité was a  of the French Navy. She was recommissioned in the Royal Navy as HMS Immortalite and had an active career on the Home Station.

French Revolutionary Wars
As the merchant ship , Davidson, master, was sailing to England from Quebec with a cargo of wood, on 16 September 1800 she encountered the French privateer Bellone, which captured her. However, four days later, Immortalite recaptured Monarch, of 645 tons (bm), and sent her into Plymouth.

Napoleonic Wars

In the months before the resumption of war with France, the Navy started preparations that included impressing seamen. As the press gangs approached they were noticed, and the crews of both Indiamen were piped to quarters. That is, they assembled on the decks armed with pikes and cutlasses, and anything they could throw. The officers in charge of the press gangs thought this mere bravado and pulled alongside the Indiamen, only to meet a severe resistance from the crewmen, who had absolutely no desire to serve in the Royal Navy. The men from Immortalite suffered several injuries from shot and pike that were thrown at them, and eventually opened fire with muskets, killing two sailors on Woodford. Even so, the press gangs were not able to get on board either Indiaman, and eventually withdrew some distance. When Woodfords officers finally permitted the press gang from Immortalite to board, all they found on board were a few sickly sailors.

Fate
Immortalite was broken up in July 1806.

Citations

References
Crawford, Abraham (1851) Reminiscences of a Naval Officer, During the Late War: With Sketches and Anecdotes of Distinguished Commanders, Volume 1. (H. Colburn).

External links 
 Naval Database 
 Age of Nelson Website – HMS Immortalite

Age of Sail frigates of France
Romaine-class frigates
1795 ships
Ships built in France
Captured ships
Frigates of the Royal Navy